Prithvi Man Gurung is the governor of Gandaki Province, Nepal. He was appointed by President Bidhya Devi Bhandari on recommendation of the council of ministers of the federal government on 27 July 2021. He succeeded  Sita Kumari Poudel.

References 

Year of birth missing (living people)
Living people
Nepali Congress politicians from Gandaki Province
21st-century Nepalese politicians
Gandaki Province
Governors of Gandaki Province
People from Chitwan District